Robert Paller (born May 21, 1993) is an American-Israeli professional baseball outfielder, plays for the Israel national baseball team, and plays for the Colorado Springs Snow Sox of the Pecos League. He played college baseball for the Columbia Lions baseball team, and was First Team All-Ivy League in his senior year. He has since also played in the Frontier League, the Canadian-American Association, and the United Shore Professional Baseball League. He played left field and center field for Team Israel at the 2020 Summer Olympics in Tokyo in the summer of 2021.

Early life
Paller is from Brooklyn, New York. He attended the Berkeley Carroll School ('11), where he was coached by his father Walter Paller. Playing center field and hitting leadoff, he batted .426 as a junior with 18 stolen bases in 19 attempts, and .531 as a senior with 52 runs, 20 RBIs, and 32 stolen bases, and was named league MVP.  He was named All-Brooklyn by the New York Post in his junior and senior seasons, and All-City by the New York Post and the New York Daily News as a senior.

College baseball
Paller then attended Columbia University ('16), where he played college baseball for the Columbia Lions baseball team, primarily playing left field. In his sophomore year in 2014 he batted .296/.351/.419 with 12 doubles (3rd in the league), 16 walks (9th), and 35 RBIs (leading the league) in 186 at bats, and was named All-Ivy League second team, and Academic All-Ivy League.

In his junior year in 2015, Paller batted .264/.392/.472 with 7 home runs (4th in the league), 35 RBIs (4th), and 32 walks (leading the league) in 159 at bats.  In the summer of 2015, Paller played for the Green Bay Bullfrogs in the Northwoods League, a collegiate summer baseball league. He batted .345(7th in the league)/.433(8th)/.480 in 177 at bats. That same summer, he also played for the Bourne Braves of the Cape Cod Baseball League.

In 2016 he batted .302/.400.503(6th in the league) with 26 runs (7th), 13 doubles (3rd), 5 home runs (4th), 32 RBIs (2nd) and 24 walks (5th) in 149 at bats, and was named First Team All-Ivy League. Paller finished his Columbia career 4th in career doubles (43), 5th in walks (79), and 6th in RBIs (111).

Professional baseball

In 2016 he played for the Lake Erie Crushers of the Frontier League and the Sussex County Miners of the Canadian-American Association. Paller batted a combined .215/.365/.341 in 135 at bats.

In 2017, Paller played for the Birmingham-Bloomfield Beavers of the United Shore Professional Baseball League. He batted .367/.557/.633(leading the league in each category), with 6 home runs (7th) and 37 walks (leading the league) in 90 at bats, and had 21 at bats for Lake Erie. In 2018 he played for Birmingham-Bloomfield, and batted .228/.354/.444 in 177 at bats.
													
In 2021 he played for the Colorado Springs Snow Sox	of the Pecos League. He batted .421/.574/.614 in 88 at bats. 

In 2022, he again played for the Snow Sox. batting .271/.400/.271.

Team Israel
In 2019, Paller became an Israeli citizen so that he could compete for the Israel national baseball team in the 2020 Summer Olympics.

Paller played for the Israel national baseball team in the outfield as the team played in the 2019 European Baseball Championship - B-Pool in early July 2019 in Blagoevgrad, Bulgaria, winning all of its games and advancing to the playoffs against Team Lithuania in the 2019 Playoff Series at the end of July 2019 for the last qualifying spot for the 2019 European Baseball Championship. He batted .273/.500(7th in the tournament)/.500 with two doubles (4th), one home run, and 10 walks (1st) in 22 at bats. He also played for Team Israel at the 2019 European Baseball Championship, batting .222/.417/.593 with one double, three home runs, and nine walks in 27 at bats.

He played left field and center field for Team Israel at the 2020 Summer Olympics in Tokyo in the summer of 2021.

References

External links

1993 births
Living people
Sportspeople from Brooklyn
Baseball players from New York City
Baseball players from New York (state)
Baseball outfielders
Bourne Braves players
Columbia Lions baseball players
Lake Erie Crushers players
Sussex County Miners players
Pecos League
Jewish American baseball players
Israeli baseball players
Israeli American
Columbia College (New York) alumni
Baseball players at the 2020 Summer Olympics
Olympic baseball players of Israel
21st-century American Jews